Iraq Central FA Cup may refer to:

 Iraq Central FA League, a tournament previously known as the Iraq Central FA First Division Cup
 Iraq FA Baghdad Cup, a cup tournament organised by the Iraq Central FA